Metadioctria parvula is a species of robber flies in the family Asilidae. It is found in California.

References

Further reading

External links

 
 

Asilidae
Insects described in 1893